Olen Edward "Ode" Voigt (January 29, 1899 – April 7, 1970) was a pitcher in Major League Baseball. He was born in Wheaton, Illinois, and played baseball at Wheaton High School and the University of Illinois.

Career
Voigt started his professional baseball career in 1919 with the Rockford Rox of the Illinois–Indiana–Iowa League. The following season, he went 17-17 on the mound with a 2.79 earned run average. He also led the league with 303 innings pitched.

In 1921, Voigt pitched well again and moved up to the class A Texas League, where he struggled. He improved the next season, though. In 1923, he set career-highs with 19 wins and 332 innings pitched and led his Denver Bears team in both categories. That performance earned him a roster spot on the major league St. Louis Browns in the spring of 1924.

Voigt appeared in eight major league games, including one start, and went 1-0 with a 5.51 ERA. His final game was on May 31, after which he returned to the Western League and won 12 games the rest of the year.

Voigt did not play in organized baseball after 1924. He died at the age of 71 in Scottsdale, Arizona.

References

External links

1899 births
1970 deaths
Major League Baseball pitchers
St. Louis Browns players
Cedar Rapids Rabbits players
San Antonio Bears players
Denver Bears players
Tulsa Oilers (baseball) players
Baseball players from Illinois
Sportspeople from Wheaton, Illinois